Hemichromini is a tribe of African cichlids.
The group consists of 14 species of freshwater fish from two genera: one species in Anomalochromis and the remaining in Hemichromis.

References

External links 
 http://ctdbase.org/detail.go?type=taxon&acc=319076
 https://www.uniprot.org/taxonomy/319076
 http://myhits.isb-sib.ch/cgi-bin/view_cla_entry?name=taxid:319076

 
Pseudocrenilabrinae
Fish tribes
Cichlid fish of Africa